The Nina B. Affair (French: L'affaire Nina B., German: Affäre Nina B) is a 1961 French-West German drama film directed by Robert Siodmak and starring Nadja Tiller, Pierre Brasseur and Walter Giller.

The film's sets were designed by the art director Jean d'Eaubonne. It was shot at the Billancourt Studios in Paris and Bavaria Studios in Munich.

Cast
 Nadja Tiller as Nina Berrera 
 Pierre Brasseur as Berrera 
 Walter Giller as Holden 
 Charles Regnier as Schwerdtfeger 
 Hubert Deschamps as Romberg 
 Jacques Dacqmine as Dr. Zorn 
 Maria Meriko as Mila 
 André Certes as Falkenberg 
 Nicolas Vogel as Von Knapp 
 Ellen Bernsen as La secrétaire de Schwerdtfeger 
 Marie Mergey as l’infirmière
 Guy Decomble as Lofting 
 Philippe Forquet as Le fils de Schwerdtfeger 
 Etienne Bierry as Dietrich 
 José Luis de Vilallonga as Kurt 
 Dominique Dandrieux as Micky

References

Bibliography 
 Deborah Lazaroff Alpi. Robert Siodmak: A Biography, with Critical Analyses of His Films Noirs and a Filmography of All His Works. McFarland,1998.
Hans-Michael Bock and Tim Bergfelder. The Concise Cinegraph: An Encyclopedia of German Cinema. Berghahn Books, 2009.

External links 
 

1961 films
1961 drama films
French drama films
German drama films
West German films
1960s French-language films
Films directed by Robert Siodmak
Films based on Austrian novels
Films shot at Bavaria Studios
Films shot at Billancourt Studios
Bavaria Film films
Films with screenplays by Roger Nimier
1960s French films
1960s German films